Haplogroup O, also known as O-M175, is a human Y-chromosome DNA haplogroup. It is primarily found among populations in Southeast Asia and East Asia. It also is found in various percentages of populations of the Russian Far East, South Asia, Central Asia, Caucasus, Crimea, Ukraine, Iran, Oceania, Madagascar and the Comoros. Haplogroup O is a primary descendant of haplogroup NO-M214.

The O-M175 haplogroup is very common amongst males from China, Korea, and Southeast Asia. It has two primary branches: O1 (O-F265) and O2 (O-M122). O1 is found at high frequencies amongst males native to Southeast Asia, Taiwan, Japan, the Korean Peninsula, Madagascar and some populations in southern China and Austroasiatic speakers of India. It is high in the Melanesian populations of the Solomon Islands and Moluccas, and shows significant to high frequencies in some populations of Papuans and Papua New Guinea. O2 is found at high levels amongst Han Chinese, Tibeto-Burman populations (including many of those in Yunnan, Tibet, Burma, Northeast India, and Nepal), Manchu, Mongolians, Koreans, Vietnamese, Malays, Indonesians, Filipinos, Thais, Polynesians, East Timorese, Bruneian, Miao people, Hmong, the Naiman tribe of Kazakhs in Kazakhstan, Kazakhs in the southeast of Altai Republic, and Kazakhs in the Ili area of Xinjiang.

Origins

Haplogroup O-M175 is one of NO-M214's two branches. The other is Haplogroup N, which is common throughout North Eurasia.

Distribution
This haplogroup appears in 80-90% of most populations in East Asia and Southeast Asia, and it is almost exclusive to that region: M175 is almost nonexistent in Western Siberia, Western Asia, Europe, most of Africa, and the Americas, where its presence may be the result of recent migrations. However, certain subclades of Haplogroup O-M175 do achieve significant frequencies among some populations of Central Asia, South Asia, and Oceania. For example, one study found it at a rate of 65.81% among the Naimans, a tribe in Kazakhstan, even though the rate among Kazakhs in general is believed to be only about 9% . It has been estimated that 25% of the entire male population of the world carries O-M175. Karafet et al. (2015) have assigned the Y-DNA of 46.2% (12/26) of a sample of Papuan from Pantar Island to haplogroup NO-M214; considering their location in the Malay Archipelago, all or most of these individuals should belong to haplogroup O-M175.

An association with the spread of Austronesian languages in late antiquity is suggested by significant  levels of O-M175 among island populations of the South Pacific and Indian Ocean, including the East African littoral. For example, Haplogroup O-M50 has even been found in Bantu-speaking populations of the Comoros along 6% of O-MSY2.2(xM50), while both O-M50 and O-M95(xM88) occur commonly among the Malagasy people of Madagascar with a combined frequency of 34%. O-M175 has been found in 28.1% of Solomon Islanders from Melanesia. 12% of Uyghurs , 6.8% of Kalmyks (17.1% of Khoshuud, 6.1% of Dörwöd, 3.3% of Torguud, 0% of Buzawa), 6.2% of Altaians , 4.1% of Uzbeks on average but Uzbeks from Bukhara 12.1%, Karakalpaks (Uzbekistan) 11.4%, Sinte (Uzbekistans) 6.7% and 4.0% of Buryats. In the Caucasus region it has been found in the Nogais 6% but 5.3% in the Karan Nogais, it is also found in the Dargins of Dargwa speakers at 2.9%. In the Iranic population, it is found in Iranian (Esfahan) at 6.3%, 8.9% of Tajiks in Afghanistan 4.2% in the Pathans in Pakistan but 1% in Afghanistan, 3.1% in Burusho.

Haplogroup O-M175 ranges in various moderate to high frequencies in the ethnic minorities of South Africa. The frequency of this haplogroup is 6.14% in the Cape colored population. 18% in Cape Coloured Muslim, 38% in Cape Indian Muslims and 10% in other Cape Other Muslim. It's found 11.5% in the Réunion Creole. Haplogroup O-M175 had also been found in Latin America and Caribbean as a result of massive Chinese male migration from the 19th century. It was found in the Jamaicans at 3.8, Cubans 1.5%

Haplogroup O-M175 has been found in 88.7% of Asian American. 1.6% in Hispanic American, White Americans 0.5%, and 0.3% in African American. Another study gives 0.5% African American.

Among the sub-branches of haplogroup O-M175 are O-M119(O1a), O-M268(O1b), and O-M122(O2).

O-M175*
A broad survey of Y-chromosome variation among populations of central Eurasia found haplogroup O-M175(xM119,M95,M122) in 31% (14/45) of a sample of Koreans and in smaller percentages of Crimean Tatars (1/22 = 4.5%), Tajiks (1/16 = 6.25% Dushanbe, 1/40 = 2.5% Samarkand), Uyghurs (2/41 = 4.9%), Uzbeks (1/68 = 1.5% Surxondaryo, 1/70 = 1.4% Xorazm), and Kazakhs (1/54 = 1.9%) . However, nearly all of the purported Korean O-M175(xM119,M95,M122) Y-chromosomes may belong to Haplogroup O-M176, and later studies do not support the finding of O-M175* among similar population samples. The reported examples of O-M175(xM119,M95,M122) Y-chromosomes that have been found among these populations might therefore belong to Haplogroup O-M268*(xM95,M176) or Haplogroup O-M176 (O1b2).

A study published in 2013 found O-M175(xM119, M95, M176, M122) Y-DNA in 5.5% (1/18) Iranians from Teheran, 5.4% (2/37) Tajiks from Badakhshan Province of Afghanistan, and 1/97 Mongols from northwest Mongolia, while finding O-M176 only in 1/20 Mongols from northeast Mongolia.

O-F265 (O1) 
O1a-M119 and O1b-M268 share a common ancestor, O1-F265 (a.k.a. O-F75) approximately 33,181 (95% CI 24,461 to 36,879) YBP. O1-F265, in turn, coalesces to a common ancestor with O2-M122 approximately 33,943 (95% CI 25,124 to 37,631) YBP. Thus, O1-F265 should have existed as a single haplogroup parallel to O2-M122 for a duration of approximately 762 years (or anywhere from 0 to 13,170 years considering the 95% CIs and assuming that the phylogeny is correct) before breaking up into its two extant descendant haplogroups, O1-MSY2.2 and O1b-M268.

O-M119 (O1a) 

O-M119  (which was known briefly as O-MSY2.2, until the SNP MSY2.2 was found to be unreliable) is found frequently in Austronesian-speaking people, with a moderate distribution in southern and eastern Chinese  and Kra-dai peoples.

O-M268 (O1b) 

 O-K18 Naxi
 O-CTS4040
 O-MF56251 Observed sporadically in China (Guangxi,Phylogenetic tree of Haplogroup O at 23mofang Guangdong, Sichuan, Zhejiang, Jiangsu, Beijing), Thailand (Phuan, Yuan, Central Thai), Vietnam (Nùng, Tày)
 O-Page59/CTS10887 Found among North Han Chinese (5%), East Han Chinese (4%), South Han Chinese (3%) 
 O-F4070
 O-MF106398 Observed sporadically in China (Guangdong, Henan, Hubei, Jiangxi, Sichuan, Zhejiang, Guangxi, Heilongjiang, Jiangsu, Shandong)
 O-F779/F993/F3135 China, Vietnam (Lahu), Qatar
 O-MF107014 Observed sporadically in China (Jiangsu, Anhui, Heilongjiang)
 O-CTS5160/MF61620 China (Han, mostly Guangdong or Fujian)
 O-F2064/F1759 China (Han from Fujian, Shandong), Singapore, Vietnam (Sila, Hanhi, Kinh), Korea
 O-PH2797/CTS1127 China (especially Shandong, Jiangsu, Liaoning, Hebei, Anhui, Beijing, Henan, and Shanghai)
 O-MF66989 Observed sporadically in China (Zhejiang, Guizhou, Hebei, Jiangsu, Shanghai, Shanxi)
 O-PH2506 China (Beijing), Japan O-Y148532 China (Shandong, Heilongjiang, Liaoning, Jilin, Jiangsu, Shanghai, Sichuan, Beijing, Shaanxi), Afghanistan (Hazara) O-Y239146/MF31164 Singapore, Taiwan O-Y47392/MF17288 China (Zhejiang) O-BY182144/Y157814 China (Shandong, Gansu), Taiwan O-MF16472/MF148514 China (Guangdong, Shandong, Henan, Beijing, Hunan, Jiangsu, etc.) O-MF184575 China (Zhejiang, Jiangxi, Guangxi, Sichuan, Jiangsu, Shandong, Inner Mongolia, Jilin Korean) O-ACT3266/Y149401 China (Shandong, Jiangsu) O-PH4822 China (Beijing, Jiangsu) O-F417/M1654/CTS469 Japan (Tokyo) O-F840/F1247/F1378
 O-Y185784 Singapore O-CTS250
 O-F2760 China (Beijing, Dai) O-FGC30081 China (Hubei, Guangdong) O-CTS1451 Korea, China (Hubei, Shandong, Sichuan, Jiangxi, Hunan, Jiangsu, Chongqing, Guangdong, Anhui, Hebei, Henan, Beijing, etc.) O-CTS9996/PF4341 Philippines O-PF4341* Hunan (Han) O-CTS298 China (esp. Jiangsu, Shandong, Henan, Anhui, Shanghai, and Liaoning) O-F16308 China (esp. Hunan) O-MF2931 China (esp. Zhejiang) O-MF14344 China (esp. Shaanxi and Anhui) O-F1356 China (Shandong, Beijing), Vietnam (Kinh from Ho Chi Minh City), South Korea O-PK4
O-F838 Found in about 1.4% of Han Chinese (and esp. in Hunan, Chongqing, Jiangxi, Sichuan, Guizhou) O-CTS3857 
 O-F714
 O-F2081  Shaanxi (Han) O-F3357 
 O-F977 Liaoning O-F1199 Beijing, Sichuan O-ACT7133  Chongqing Liwutu, Jiangxi O-Y168698 Sichuan, Anhui O-CTS4052/CTS5664 Hunan (Han) O-Y155291 Anhui , medieval Turk (fl. ca. 600 - 900 CE) from the oasis of Otrar O-CTS2452 Guangxi, Hunan O-F15640/F11242 Fujian, Singapore, Spain (Burgos) O-F16212 
 O-F21414 Fujian 
 O-F15452 
 O-F15300 Chongqing, Guizhou, Anhui O-F14826 Hunan [Yong zhou Tang family] O-MF45275 Guangxi O-Y34152 
 O-MF43808 Sichuan, Hunan O-MF37500 Hunan O-MF43192 Sichuan, Hunan O-M95
 O-CTS350 China (Ningxia, Yunnan, Heilongjiang, Hunan, Shaanxi, Anhui, etc.) O-CTS350* Japan (Aichi) O-CTS10007/CTS926 China (esp. Hunan and Guangdong) O-M1310
 O-Y172653/Y172877 Found in China (esp. Zhejiang, Fujian, Guangdong, Sichuan, Hunan, Jiangxi, Hubei, Chongqing) and Japan O-F1803/M1348 China (Zhejiang, Shandong, Beijing, Guangdong, Hubei, Sichuan, Jiangsu, Shanghai, etc.) O-ACT721/ACT1038 Found sporadically in China (Zhejiang, Anhui, Hunan, Hainan, Tianjin, Beijing, Liaoning, Heilongjiang) O-F789/M1283 Found in China (Blang, Palaung, Wa, Dai, Yi, Naxi), Vietnam, Cambodia, Singapore (Malay), Java, Borneo, Thailand, Laos, Myanmar, Bhutan, Bangladesh, India (Tripura, Ho, Konda Dora, Gond) O-M1283* Lao Isan O-MF600645 Gansu (Hui, Dongxiang), Sichuan (Chengdu), Hunan (Yiyang) O-M1368 Singapore O-M1361
 O-MF611153 Found sporadically in China (Hunan, Hubei, Chongqing, Guangxi, Jiangxi) O-A22938 Vietnam (Kinh from Ho Chi Minh City), China (Hong Kong, Qinzhou, Chongqing, Lijiang) O-F2194 China (esp. Guangxi, with a few members in Yunnan, Chongqing, Hubei, etc.) O-BY189914 China (mostly Guangdong, Guangxi) O-F16163 China (Guangdong, Sichuan, Hubei, etc.), Taiwan O-F20644 China (Guangxi, Yunnan, Guangdong, Gansu, Hunan, Sichuan, etc.) O-SK1646 China (mostly Sichuan, but also Gansu, Yunnan, Guizhou, etc.) O-Y9322 China (Dai in Xishuangbanna, Yunnan, Chongqing, Guangdong, Sichuan, etc.) O-Y9325
 O-Z39485 China (Dai, Yi) O-Z39490
 O-Z39490* Indonesia (Yogyakarta, Lebbo), Singapore (Malay) O-B421 Sichuan, Singapore (Malay), Java (Dieng), Madhya Pradesh (Gond), Saudi Arabia (ar-Riyāḍ) O-Y9033/B426 Laos (Laotian), Thailand (Blang, Khmu, Lawa, Htin, Padaung Karen, Tai Dam, Suay, Khmer, Mon, Lao Isan, Soa, Shan, Phutai, Nyaw, S'gaw Karen, Thai, Khon Mueang), Vietnam (Mang from Mường Tè District, Ede from Krông Buk District and Tuy An District, Kinh from Hoàng Mai District, Gia Lâm District, and Yên Phong District, Thái from Điện Biên Phủ, Giarai from Ayun Pa) O-Y9033* Indonesia (Jawa Tengah), India (Tripura, Konda Dora), Bangladesh O-M6661 Kinh in Ho Chi Minh City O-YP3930 Cambodia, Thailand (Mlabri, S'gaw Karen, Pwo Karen, Tai Yuan), Laos (Laotian in Vientiane) O-F1252 
O-SK1630/F5504 China (esp. Sichuan and Guizhou, accounting for about 0.25% of the entire Chinese population)O-ACT5802
O-MF92614
O-F16061
O-MF286118 Found in two Han Chinese from GuangdongO-F19607
O-SK1636 China (esp. Hunan, Sichuan, Guizhou, Chongqing, Gansu, and Henan)O-MF206811 China (Shaanxi, Sichuan, Henan)O-MF91645 China (Han from Mianyang, Tujia from Zhangjiajie)O-Y68888 Russia (Ryazan Oblast)O-F5506 Hmong (Hunan) 
 O-F2924
 O-CTS5854
 O-Z23810
 O-CTS7399
 O-Y85641 China (esp. Shandong, Liaoning, Jilin, Heilongjiang) O-Y14024/FGC19706 Japan (Tokyo) O-FGC19713/Y14026 Laos (Laotian in Vientiane and Luang Prabang), Thailand (Tai Dam, Tai Lue, Nyah Kur, Thai, Eastern Lawa), Vietnam (Thái from Bá Thước District and Tủa Chùa District, Hà Nhì from Mường Tè District) O-FGC19707
 O-MF14427 China (esp. Jiangsu, Gansu, Henan, Shandong, Shanxi, Hebei, Shaanxi) O-FGC19716 China (Hong Kong, Guangdong, Hunan, Chongqing) O-FGC19718 China (esp. Fujian, Jiangxi, Hubei, Jiangsu, Guangdong), Philippines (Capiz) O-Z23849 China (Chongqing Han, Xishuangbanna Dai, Guangxi Zhuang, Guangdong, Shandong, Tianjin) O-CTS651/CTS10484 Thailand (Tai Khün, Phuan, Tai Lue, Khon Mueang, Eastern Lawa, Lao Isan, Thai), Laos (Laotian in Vientiane), Vietnam (Dao and Nùng from Hoàng Su Phì District, Tày from Krông Pắk District, Hà Quảng District, and Đình Lập District) O-CTS10484* China (Guangxi) O-PH4310 China (Guangdong, Sichuan, Beijing), Singapore O-Z1018 China (Hunan, Xishuangbanna Dai, Guangxi) O-Z23781 China (Henan) O-F4229 Singapore O-F809 China (Xishuangbanna Dai, Guangdong, Chongqing) O-Z23795 China (esp. Zhejiang) O-MF223122 China (Linyi, Mianyang) O-A22937
 O-BY50703
 O-MF169272 China (Daurs, Qiqihar, Harbin, Heihe, Hulunbuir, Xilingol League, Beijing) O-MF226417 China (Beijing, Hangzhou) O-MF61630 China (Baoji, Hanzhong, Shijiazhuang, Tangshan, Yantai, Shaoxing) O-F2517 China (Hubei, Guangdong, Guangxi, Hunan, etc.) O-MF5664
 O-Z23790
 O-M111/M88 Found frequently among Vietnamese, Tai peoples (Bouyei, Zhuang, Nùng, Tày, Thái people in Vietnam, Lao, Northeastern Thai, Northern Thai, general population of Bangkok), Lachi, Lô Lô, Hani-Akha, Bunu, She people, Cambodians, Kuy, Bru, and Htin, with a moderate distribution among Qiang, Bai, Yi, Bamar, Jingpo, Lahu, Tujia, Han Chinese, Miao, Pathen, Yao, Hlai, Taiwanese aborigines (especially Bunun), the Philippines, Malaysia (Kota Kinabalu), Kalimantan (Banjarmasin), Java, Chamic-speaking peoples (Cham from Bình Thuận, Ede, Jarai), and Kiribati O-M111/M88* Northern Thailand (Htin, Lawa), Cambodia (Jarai, Brao, Kachac, Khmer, Lao, Lun), Yunnan (De'ang) O-F2524
 O-F2524* Jiangsu O-F2346
 O-F2890 Thailand (Khon Mueang, Phuan, Shan, Htin, Tai Dam, Thai, Lawa, Lao Isan, Mon), Vietnam (Kinh from Gia Lâm District, Tày from Lục Yên District) O-F2890* Ho Chi Minh City O-Z24048
 O-F18990 Jiangsu, Jiangxi, Xishuangbanna (Dai) O-Z24050
 O-Z24050* Xishuangbanna (Dai) O-ACT7172 Guangdong O-Y151536
 O-Z22028 Hunan, Anhui, Guangdong O-Y151537
 O-Y151537* Hunan O-ACT523
 O-ACT505 Guangdong O-ACT502 Jiangxi, Hunan, Guangxi O-F2758 Vietnam (Kinh, Lahu, Dao, Pathen, Tày, Thái, Ede, Giarai), Cambodia (Kuy, Tampuan, Khmer), Thailand (Phutai, Bru, Tai Khün, Phuan, Tai Dam, Shan, Khon Mueang, Mon, Lao Isan, Tai Lue, Htin, Lawa, Khmu, Kaleun, Nyaw, Suay, Thai), Laos (Laotian in Luang Prabang), Yunnan (Bulang, De'ang) O-F2758* China (Miao, Hunan) O-Z24083
 O-Z24083* Ho Chi Minh City (Kinh) O-Z24089
 O-SK1627/Z24091 Vietnam (Lô Lô from Mèo Vạc District, La Chí and Nùng from Hoàng Su Phì District, Hà Nhì from Mường Tè District, Tày from Chợ Đồn District and Đăk Mil District, Ede from Ea Kar District, Kinh from Nghĩa Hưng District), Thailand (Soa, Saek, Phutai, Suay, Tai Dam, S'gaw Karen, Nyah Kur, Khmer, Lawa, Lao Isan, Mon, Thai), Laos (Laotian in Vientiane) O-Z24091* China (Hebei, Xishuangbanna Dai), Vietnam (Kinh from Ho Chi Minh City) O-Y26364
 O-Y26364* Thailand (Phutai from Sakon Nakhon Province) O-Y26370 China (Tujia), Vietnam (Kinh from Ho Chi Minh City) O-F923
 O-F923* Xishuangbanna (Dai), Ho Chi Minh City (Kinh) O-Z24154 Ho Chi Minh City (Kinh) O-CTS2022
 O-CTS2022* Ho Chi Minh City (Kinh) O-F3053 Thailand (Tai Lue, Khon Mueang) O-F3053* Cambodian O-F4383/F1399 Vietnam (Nùng from Hoàng Su Phì District) O-F4383/F1399* China (Han from Chongqing), Singapore O-F14994 Vietnam (Kinh from Ho Chi Minh City), Singapore O-F2415 Thailand (Tai Lue, Khon Mueang, Lao Isan, Mon, Thai), China (Dai from Xishuangbanna, Yongbei Zhuang from Guangxi, Han from Hunan) O-M176
 O-M176(x47z): Found frequently among Koreans, with a moderate distribution among Buryats, Daurs, Evenks, Hezhe, Indonesians, Japanese, Manchus, Micronesians, Ryukyuans, Sibe, Thais, Udegeys, Vietnamese.
 O-47z: Found frequently among Japanese and Ryukyuans, with a moderate distribution among Indonesians, Koreans, Manchus, Thais.

O-M122 (O2) 

Found frequently among populations of East Asia, Southeast Asia, and culturally Austronesian regions of Oceania, with a moderate distribution in Central Asia .

O-M122
O-CTS1754 East & Southeast AsiaO-F953/F1886 PhilippinesO-F953* Ho Chi Minh City (Kinh)O-F1024
O-F1024* GuangxiO-Y29790 Liaoning, FujianO-M324
O-L465
O-CTS727
O-F915
O-F915* ShanxiO-Y14462
O-Y14462* GuangdongO-CTS1936 Beijing, Ho Chi Minh CityO-A18267 
O-A18029 ChinaO-ACT6559 HebeiO-CTS3709
O-CTS11209
O-CTS11209* Han from HunanO-L599 Han from Hunan, Kinh from Ho Chi Minh City, TujiaO-F2640
O-F2640* BeijingO-CTS11210
O-CTS11210* Han from HunanO-CTS2432 Han from HunanO-JST002611/CTS2483
O-CTS2483* China, Japan, PhilippinesO-CTS10573 Beijing, Sichuan, Henan, JiangsuO-CTS10573* Beijing, Dai from XishuangbannaO-MF7367
O-MF7367* DaiO-MF9367 South Korea, Japan (Kōchi)O-F18
O-CTS498 China, Japan (Tokyo)O-F449 AzerbaijanO-F1266, F2016, F4267 Beijing, Jilin, Shanxi, Jiangsu, Shanghai, GuangdongO-F238
O-FGC62457
O-CTS679 Hubei, Fujian (Han)O-MF19356 Guizhou, Chongqing, JiangxiO-F134
O-F134*
O-F1894 Beijing, Shanghai, Liaoning, Jilin, Hebei, Shanxi, Zhejiang, GuangdongO-F1894* Hunan (Han), BeijingO-MF18144
O-MF18144* ShandongO-F18567 South Korea, JapaneseO-MF8794
O-MF8794* China (Han)O-MF1155
O-MF1155* Anhui, Myanmar (Mandalay)O-MF1157 Guangdong, Jiangxi, Russia (Moscow Oblast)O-F117
O-F117* FujianO-F11
O-F11* Gansu, JapaneseO-F930 Beijing, Armenia, Inner Mongolia, Hebei, Shaanxi, Shandong, Zhejiang, HubeiO-F2685 Beijing, Shanghai, Fujian, GuangdongO-BY169374
O-BY169374* ZhejiangO-SK1692
O-SK1692* GuangdongO-MF55116 Pakistan (Hazaras)O-F539 Beijing, Shanghai, Jiangsu, Zhejiang, Jiangxi, Guangdong, YunnanO-F539*
O-F319 Vietnam (Ho Chi Minh City), HunanO-CTS12877
O-F16635
O-F16635* South KoreaO-ACT3882 Hubei, Hunan (Han)O-CTS257 Zhejiang, Shanghai, Guangdong, Beijing, Fujian, Heilongjiang, HunanO-CTS257* South Korea, Japan (Tokyo)O-F16834
O-F16834* Vietnam (Ho Chi Minh City)O-Y166692 Lahu, YiO-Y29837
O-Y29837* Hebei, Fujian (Han)O-MF8526
O-MF8526* Sichuan, ZhejiangO-Y135777 ChinaO-BY36917 JapanO-F270 Beijing, Hebei, ShandongO-F270* HezhenO-F1272 JiangsuO-F4062 Beijing, Shanghai, Guangdong, Jiangsu, Shandong, Shaanxi, Chongqing, Heilongjiang, Liaoning, Henan, Hubei, Hunan, ZhejiangO-Y15976 China, Japan, Korea, Pakistan, VietnamO-Y15976* Zhejiang, Vietnam (Ho Chi Minh City)O-Y26383
O-Y26383* HubeiO-SK1686
O-SK1686* Pakistan (Brahui)O-Y46851 South KoreaO-FGC54474
O-FGC54474* Skeleton exhumed from a mass grave (2083 +- 27 YBP uncal) located in Nomgon, Ömnögovi, MongoliaO-FGC54505 China, Japan (Okinawa)O-MF8460 AnhuiO-MF9523 South KoreaO-F971 Beijing, Shanghai, Hubei, GuangdongO-F971* Sichuan, Zhejiang, Jiangxi, JapanO-Y23813
O-Y23813* GuangdongO-Y23809
O-Y23809* GuangdongO-BY170727
O-Y23907 GuangdongO-F632
O-F632* BeijingO-F16340 ZhejiangO-F133 China, BulgariaO-F133* BeijingO-Y20951
O-Y20951* AnhuiO-Y20932 Anhui, BeijingO-F17
O-F377 China, FranceO-CTS7789 Han Chinese (Beijing, Shanghai, Fujian, Guangdong, Hunan, Sichuan)O-CTS7789* Beijing, GuangdongO-F1095
O-F1095* Fujian (Han)O-Z25097
O-Z25097* Hunan (Han)O-Z7776 Hunan (Han), GuangdongO-CTS7501
O-CTS7501* Zhejiang, Hunan (Han)O-CTS1621
O-CTS1621* Hubei, Hunan (Han)O-Y147084 JiangxiO-F793 Beijing, Tianjin, Shandong, Shanxi, Shaanxi, Xinjiang, Jiangsu, Shanghai, Hubei, Sichuan, GuangdongO-F793* Sichuan, Guangdong, Guizhou, Hunan, Jiangsu, French Polynesia, She, North China (Han)O-Y150436
O-Y150436* JiangxiO-Y150331 Jiangxi, YunnanO-Y141213 Jilin, Liaoning, Henan, Shandong, JiangsuO-P201
O-M188
O-M188* KoreaO-CTS800
O-CTS800* Beijing, JapanO-CTS1602 Han from FujianO-CTS445
O-CTS201 KoreaO-M159 China, Taiwan, Cambodia, Malaysia, SingaporeO-Z35182
O-Z35182* China (Han)O-MF2541 Fujian, Taiwan (Chiayi City), Cambodia (Siem Reap)O-CTS5032
O-CTS5032* Hunan (Han)O-CTS10690 Hunan (Han)O-MF18110/FGC50590 China (esp. Guangdong, Zhejiang, Hunan, Shandong, and Guangxi)O-MF109844
O-MF106775 China (esp. Shandong, Jiangsu, and Henan)O-MF106730 China (esp. Guangdong and Guangxi)O-FGC50661 China (esp. Jiangsu and Hunan)O-MF56709
O-MF213370 Found sporadically in Yangzhou, Shanghai, LiangshanO-MF56898 China (esp. Hunan, Sichuan, Chongqing, Shanghai)O-FGC50643/MF15475 China (Shandong, Hebei, Hubei, Shanxi, Anhui, Jiangsu, etc.)O-MF56474 China (Jiangsu, Anhui, Jilin, Shandong, etc.)O-FGC50649
O-Y169696/MF14256 China (esp. Jiangsu, Shandong, Zhejiang, and Shanghai)O-FGC50558 Japan, KoreaO-FGC50558* Korea, JapaneseO-Y165513 KoreaO-FGC50535 KoreaO-M7 Found frequently among human remains associated with the Neolithic Daxi culture and modern Hmong–Mien, Katuic, and Bahnaric peoples, with a moderate distribution among Han Chinese , Buyei , Bai , Mosuo , Tibetans , Qiang , Oroqen , Tujia , Thai , Orang Asli  , western Indonesians ( and ), Malaysians , Vietnamese , and Atayal .
O-M7* Hubei, Philippines (possibly O-Y26395)O-Y26395 Taiwan (Amis)O-F1276
O-F1863
O-F1863* Zhejiang, Dai (Xishuangbanna)O-V3237 Kinh (Ho Chi Minh City)O-CTS6489
O-CTS6489* Dai (Xishuangbanna)O-F1275
O-ACT1126 FujianO-CTS6579 Hunan (Han)O-Z25398
O-Z25398* Kinh (Ho Chi Minh City)O-F1100
O-F1100* HunanO-F1234
O-Y185160 Hebei, BeijingO-F14904/N5 Ningxia, Hmong (Northern Thailand), She, Iu Mien (Phayao Province), Quebec. Huang et al. (2022) found that this is the most common Y-chromosome haplogroup among many Hmongic-speaking ethnic groups (including Guangxi Miao, Hunan Miao, Hunan Pa-hng, and Thailand Hmong), with a frequency of 47.1% among the Guangxi Miao.
O-P164
O-F996/F3237
O-A16433 HeilongjiangO-MF56976 AnhuiO-Y125645
O-Y149134 Anhui, HenanO-PF5573
O-PF5573* GuangdongO-Y101407 KoreaO-MF14338
O-MF14338* TatarstanO-Y153434
O-Y153434* ShandongO-MF76414 Chongqing, Skeleton exhumed from a mass grave (2083 +- 27 YBP uncal) located in Nomgon, Ömnögovi, MongoliaO-F871
O-F706 Philippines, China, Cambodia, Thailand (Bru in Sakon Nakhon Province)O-F1010 Thailand (Eastern Lawa, Blang, Palaung, Khon Mueang from Chiang Rai Province)O-F1010* ZhejiangO-Y170907
O-Y170907* South KoreaO-Y171445 Zhejiang, Japan (Mie)O-AM01750/AM01861/B451 Singapore (Malay), Indonesia (Bajo), Philippines (Batak)O-AM01861* SpainO-B450 Philippines, Indonesia (Bajo), Singapore (Malay)O-BY157019 Mexico (Jalisco), MicronesiaO-A16139 Philippines (Cebu), USA (California)O-F2472
O-F4110 Thailand (Pray)O-F4110* FujianO-MF1510
O-MF1510* Tonga (ʻEua)O-ACT3918 ZhejiangO-F4124
O-F15739
O-F14875 Vietnam (Ho Chi Minh City), Xinjiang (Han)O-F26088/JST008425p6 Japan, Hunan (Tujia, HGDP01102)O-A16609
O-MF1232 Henan, Fujian (Han)O-M134: Found frequently among speakers of Sino-Tibetan languages,  among members of the Kazakh Naiman tribe  with a moderate distribution throughout East Asia and Southeast Asia.
O-Y20/PAGES00125 PolandO-F1725
O-F1725* Ho Chi Minh City (Kinh)O-Y31255
O-FGC61200
O-FGC61200* Henan (Han)O-FGC61168 SichuanO-A16615/CTS11009
O-Y85894
O-Y85894* FujianO-Y19010 ShandongO-CTS682/CTS2272
O-BY146675 KoreanO-BY161237 Japan (Tokyo, Kanagawa)O-Y12/F314
O-Y12* Beijing (Han)O-CTS2643/CTS11192
O-CTS53
O-CTS53* ChinaO-CTS6373 Hunan (Han), Xishuangbanna (Dai)O-F876
O-F876* Henan, ShaanxiO-Y29829 LiaoningO-F275
O-F275* Henan, ShandongO-F14411/CTS1011 JapanO-Z2037 Beijing (Han)O-CTS2815
O-CTS2815* South KoreaO-F700
O-F700* Hunan, Liaoning, Japan (Tokyo)O-F14475 Hunan (Han)O-F2505
O-F2505* HebeiO-MF194 Korean, Ho Chi Minh City (Kinh)O-F634
O-F634* ShandongO-F209 Beijing (Han)O-F1391
O-F1391* ZhejiangO-F4117 Jiangxi, Sichuan (Han)O-A5034
O-MF357
O-ACT1039
O-MF308 KoreanO-CTS4266
O-F14839 Henan (Han)O-Z26108
O-Y30135
O-Y30135* Beijing (Han)O-F2173
O-F2173* Sichuan (Han)O-F1458 Shandong, AnhuiO-Z26156
O-Z26156* Ho Chi Minh City (Kinh)O-BY102696
O-BY102696* KoreanO-BY61500 GuangdongO-CTS3776/F2887
O-CTS3776* Beijing (Han), Fujian (Han), JapanO-CTS3763
O-CTS4601 FujianO-Y7110
O-Y13527
O-Y13527* Beijing (Han)O-FGC16888/Z38720 TaiwanO-MF805 Guizhou, South KoreaO-Y22112
O-FGC16885/FGC16887 KazakhstanO-Y7111
O-MF13415 ChinaO-F4249/SK1769 China, South KoreaO-F4249* JiangsuO-FGC23868
O-FGC23868* Mongol (Hulunbuir)O-FGC23859 JiangsuO-CTS335 Zhejiang, Jiangsu, GansuO-CTS335* Japan (Tokyo), XiboO-Y142071
O-Y142071* AnhuiO-CTS3856
O-CTS3856* Beijing (Han)O-CTS5741
O-CTS1174 Hunan (Han)O-F15948 Jiangxi, ThailandO-M117/PAGE23
O-MF1380/CTS4960 China, Korea, Japan, IndonesiaO-MF1388
O-MF1388* North China (Han), Japan (Akita)O-Y139283 Anhui, GuangdongO-MF2636
O-MF2636* ChongqingO-CTS374 Jiangsu, Beijing (Han)O-M133/M1706 ShandongO-M1706* Japan (Tokyo)O-YP4864
O-YP4864* KoreanO-Z44076 Shandong, Philippines (Cebu)O-CTS7634
O-CTS7634* Fujian (Han), Beijing (Han), Mongolia (Selenge), RussiaO-F2188
O-MF23641
O-MF23641* ChinaO-Y169190 FujianO-Y29861 Henan, Fujian, Ho Chi Minh City (Kinh)O-F3039 Shandong, Ho Chi Minh City (Kinh), Philippines (Cebu)O-M1726
O-A9457
O-A9457*
O-MF15246 Zhejiang, KoreanO-F17158
O-F15367
O-F15367* GuangdongO-Y174543 Hunan, Japan (Tokyo)O-CTS9678
O-CTS9678* TianjinO-M1513
O-M1513* ShandongO-F18746 Fujian (Han)O-Z39663 Russia, Liaoning, Shandong, Fujian (Han)O-A9459
O-F6800
O-F6800* ShanxiO-Y8389
O-Y8389* Japan (Tokyo)O-Y9144
O-Y9144* GuangdongO-Y8387
O-Y8387* Shanghai, ChongqingO-CTS5481 Japan (Tokyo), KoreanO-F14249
O-F14249* LiaoningO-ACT4506 Mongol (Hulunbuir), GuangdongO-Y81597 South Korea, North Korea (North Hamgyong Province)O-F14347
O-F14347* Beijing (Han)O-CTS5063
O-CTS5063* Sichuan, Jiangxi, FujianO-Z44927
O-Z44927* AnhuiO-MF21798 Zhejiang, Xishuangbanna (Dai)O-CTS1154
O-CTS1154* Fujian, GuangxiO-Z25902
O-Z25902* Hebei, FujianO-Z42620 Fujian, Ho Chi Minh City (Kinh)O-F438 Japan (Tokyo)O-F438* Hunan (Han)O-Y17728
O-Y17728* Beijing (Han), ShandongO-Y170157 Shandong, KoreanO-F1754
O-F1754* Beijing (Han)O-F2137
O-F2137* JiangsuO-F1123 Jilin, ZhejiangO-F316
O-F316* AnhuiO-CTS1304
O-CTS1304* Jiangsu, ShandongO-F813
O-F813* Shandong, Jiangxi, GuangdongO-Y138426 Shandong, ChongqingO-Y154488 HunanO-Y20928 HenanO-Y20928* Inner Mongolia, Beijing (Han), Shandong, AnhuiO-Y174105
O-Y174105* HenanO-Y137637 Shandong, JiangsuO-CTS1642
O-CTS1642* BangladeshO-CTS5308
O-CTS5308* Beijing (Han)O-F20067
O-F20067* Shannan (Tibetan)O-M3873 Gansu, Shigatse (Tibetan)O-Y34065
O-Y34065* Northeast India (Riang)O-F16227 Shigatse (Sherpa), Xishuangbanna (Dai)O-MF1012
O-MF1012* Nyingchi (Tibetan)O-Y67478
O-Y67478*
O-CTS5672 JapaneseO-F14408
O-Y101264 Shigatse (Tibetan), Northeast India (Riang)O-F14422
O-F14422* Northeast India (Riang), Myanmar (Yangon)O-A9463
O-A9463* BangladeshO-Y34067 Northeast India (Riang)O-F14665 Xishuangbanna (Dai), NaxiO-Y7080
O-Y7080* Xishuangbanna (Dai), GuangdongO-ACT1169 Guangdong, FujianO-Z26030
O-Z26030* GuangxiO-F14479 Guangdong, Xishuangbanna (Dai), Ho Chi Minh City (Kinh) O-M324 (O2a) 

 O-F742 (O2b) 

Language families and genes

Haplogroup O is associated with populations which speak Austric languages.
This has been called the "Father Tongue Hypothesis" by George van Driem . It does not appear to account for O-M176, which is found among Japanese, Korean, and Manchurian males.

Phylogenetics
Phylogenetic history

Prior to 2002, there were in academic literature at least seven naming systems for the Y-Chromosome Phylogenetic tree. This led to considerable confusion. In 2002, the major research groups came together and formed the Y-Chromosome Consortium (YCC). They published a joint paper that created a single new tree that all agreed to use. Later, a group of citizen scientists with an interest in population genetics and genetic genealogy formed a working group to create an amateur tree aiming at being, above all, timely.  The table below brings together all of these works at the point of the landmark 2002 YCC Tree. This allows a researcher reviewing older published literature to quickly move between nomenclatures.

Original Research Publications
The following research teams per their publications were represented in the creation of the YCC Tree.

Phylogenetic trees
ISOGG 2017 tree (ver. 12.244).

O (M175)
O1 (F265/M1354, CTS2866, F75/M1297, F429/M1415, F465/M1422)
O1a (M119)
O1a1 (B384/Z23193)
O1a1a (M307.1/P203.1)
O1a1a1 (F446)
O1a1a1a (F140)
O1a1a1a1 (F78)
O1a1a1a1a (F81)
O1a1a1a1a1 (CTS2458)
O1a1a1a1a1a (F533)
O1a1a1a1a1a1 (F492)
O1a1a1a1a1a1a (F656)
O1a1a1a1a1a1a1 (A12440)
O1a1a1a1a1a1a1a (A12439)
O1a1a1a1a1a1a2 (A14788)
O1a1a1a1a1a1a3 (F65)
O1a1a1a1a1a1a4 (MF1068)
O1a1a1a1a1a1a5 (Z23482)
O1a1a1a1a1a1b (FGC66168)
O1a1a1a1a1a1b1 (CTS11553)
O1a1a1a1a1a1c (Y31266)
O1a1a1a1a1a1c1 (Y31261)
O1a1a1a1a1a1d (A12441)
O1a1a1a1a1a1e (MF1071)
O1a1a1a1a1a1e1 (MF1074)
O1a1a1a1a1a2 (CTS4585)
O1a1a1a1a2 (MF1075)
O1a1a1a2 (YP4610/Z39229)
O1a1a1a2a (AM00330/AMM480/B386)
O1a1a1a2a1 (AM00333/AMM483/B387)
O1a1a1a2a1a (B388)
O1a1a1a2b (SK1555)
O1a1a1b (SK1568/Z23420)
O1a1a1b1 (M101)
O1a1a1b2 (Z23392)
O1a1a1b2a (Z23442)
O1a1a1b2a1 (SK1571)
O1a1a2 (CTS52)
O1a1a2a (CTS701)
O1a1a2a1 (K644/Z23266)
O1a1b (CTS5726)
O1a2 (M110)
O1a2a (F3288)
O1a2a1 (B392)
O1a2a1a (B393)
O1a3 (Page109)
O1b (M268)
O1b1 (F2320)
O1b1a (M1470)
O1b1a1 (PK4)
O1b1a1a (M95)
O1b1a1a1 (F1803/M1348)
O1b1a1a1a (F1252)
O1b1a1a1a1 (F2924)
O1b1a1a1a1a (M111)
O1b1a1a1a1a1 (F2758)
O1b1a1a1a1a1a (Z24083)
O1b1a1a1a1a1a1 (Z24089)
O1b1a1a1a1a1a1a (F923)
O1b1a1a1a1a1a1a1 (CTS2022)
O1b1a1a1a1a1a1a1a (F1399)
O1b1a1a1a1a1a1a1a1 (F2415)
O1b1a1a1a1a1a1a2 (Z24131)
O1b1a1a1a1a1a1a3 (Z24100)
O1b1a1a1a1a1a1b (SK1627/Z24091)
O1b1a1a1a1a1a1b1 (Z39410)
O1b1a1a1a1a1a2 (Z24088)
O1b1a1a1a1a2 (F2890)
O1b1a1a1a1a2a (Z24048)
O1b1a1a1a1a2a1 (Z24050)
O1b1a1a1a1a2b (Z24014)
O1b1a1a1a1b (CTS5854)
O1b1a1a1a1b1 (Z23810)
O1b1a1a1a1b1a (CTS7399)
O1b1a1a1a1b1a1 (FGC19713/Y14026)
O1b1a1a1a1b1a1a (Z23849)
O1b1a1a1a1b1a1a1 (FGC61038)
O1b1a1a1a1b1b (CTS651)
O1b1a1a1a1b1b1 (CTS9884)
O1b1a1a1a1b2 (F4229)
O1b1a1a1a1b2a (F809)
O1b1a1a1a1b2a1 (F2517)
O1b1a1a1a2 (SK1630)
O1b1a1a1a2a (SK1636)
O1b1a1a1b (F789/M1283)
O1b1a1a1b1 (FGC29900/Y9322/Z23667)
O1b1a1a1b1a (B426/FGC29896/Y9033/Z23671)
O1b1a1a1b1a1 (FGC29907/YP3930)
O1b1a1a1b1a2 (B427/Z23680)
O1b1a1a1b1b (Z39485)
O1b1a1a1b1c (B418)
O1b1a1a1b2 (SK1646)
O1b1a1a2 (CTS350)
O1b1a1a3 (Page103)
O1b1a1b (F838)
O1b1a1b1 (F1199)
O1b1a2 (Page59)
O1b1a2a (F993)
O1b1a2a1 (F1759)
O1b1a2a1a (CTS1127)
O1b1a2b (F417/M1654)
O1b1a2b1 (F840)
O1b1a2b1a (F1127)
O1b1a2b2 (CTS1451)
O1b1a2c (CTS9996)
O1b2 (P49, M176)
O1b2a (F1942/Page92)
O1b2a1 (CTS9259)
O1b2a1a (F1204)
O1b2a1a1 (CTS713) 
O1b2a1a1a (CTS1875)
O1b2a1a1a1 (CTS10682)
O1b2a1a1b (Z24598)
O1b2a1a1c (CTS203)
O1b2a1a2 (F2868) 
O1b2a1a2a (L682)
O1b2a1a2a1 (CTS723)
O1b2a1a2a1a (CTS7620)
O1b2a1a2a1b (A12446)
O1b2a1a2a1b1 (PH40)
O1b2a1a2b (F940)
O1b2a1a3 (CTS10687)
O1b2a1a3a (CTS1215)
O1b2a1b (CTS562)
O1b2a2 (Page90)
O2 (M122)
O2a (M324)
O2a1 (L127.1)
O2a1a (F1876/Page127)
O2a1a1 (F2159)
O2a1a1a (F1867/Page124)
O2a1a1a1 (F852)
O2a1a1a1a (F2266)
O2a1a1a1a1 (L599)
O2a1a1a1a1a (Z43961)
O2a1a1a1a1a1 (Z43963)
O2a1a1a1b (F854)
O2a1a1a1b1 (Z43966)
O2a1a1a1c (Page130)
O2a1a1b (F915)
O2a1a1b1 (F1478)
O2a1a1b1a (PF5390)
O2a1a1b1a1 (CTS1936)
O2a1a1b1a1a (Z43975)
O2a1a1b1a2 (FGC33994)
O2a1b (M164)
O2a1c (IMS-JST002611)
O2a1c1 (F18)
O2a1c1a (F117)
O2a1c1a1 (F13)
O2a1c1a1a (F11)
O2a1c1a1a1 (F632)
O2a1c1a1a1a (F110/M11115)
O2a1c1a1a1a1 (F17)
O2a1c1a1a1a1a (F377)
O2a1c1a1a1a1a1 (F1095)
O2a1c1a1a1a1a1a (F856)
O2a1c1a1a1a1a1a1 (F1418)
O2a1c1a1a1a1a1a2 (Z25097)
O2a1c1a1a1a1a2 (CTS7501)
O2a1c1a1a1a1b (F793)
O2a1c1a1a1a2 (Y20951)
O2a1c1a1a1a2a (Y20932)
O2a1c1a1a2 (F38)
O2a1c1a1a3 (F12)
O2a1c1a1a4 (F930)
O2a1c1a1a4a (F2685)
O2a1c1a1a5 (F1365/M5420/PF1558)
O2a1c1a1a5a (Y15976)
O2a1c1a1a5a1 (Y16154)
O2a1c1a1a5a1a (Y26383)
O2a1c1a1a5a1a1 (SK1686)
O2a1c1a1a5b (FGC54486)
O2a1c1a1a5b1 (FGC54507)
O2a1c1a1a6 (CTS12877)
O2a1c1a1a6a (F2527)
O2a1c1a1a6a1 (CTS5409)
O2a1c1a1a6a2 (F2941)
O2a1c1a1a7 (F723)
O2a1c1a1a8 (CTS2107)
O2a1c1a1a9 (SK1691)
O2a1c1a1b (PH203)
O2a1c1b (F449)
O2a1c1b1 (F238)
O2a1c1b1a (F134)
O2a1c1b1a1 (F1273)
O2a1c1b1a2 (F724)
O2a1c1b2 (F1266)
O2a1c1c (CTS498)
O2a1c2 (FGC3750/SK1673)
O2a2 (IMS-JST021354/P201)
O2a2a (M188)
O2a2a1 (F2588)
O2a2a1a (CTS445)
O2a2a1a1 (CTS201)
O2a2a1a1a (M159/Page96)
O2a2a1a2 (M7)
O2a2a1a2a (F1276)
O2a2a1a2a1 (CTS6489)
O2a2a1a2a1a (F1275)
O2a2a1a2a1a1 (M113)
O2a2a1a2a1a2 (N5)
O2a2a1a2a1a3 (Z25400)
O2a2a1a2a2 (F1863)
O2a2a1a2a2a (F1134)
O2a2a1a2a2a1 (F1262)
O2a2a1a2b (Y26403)
O2a2a1b (F1837)
O2a2a2 (F879)
O2a2a2a (F1226)
O2a2a2a1 (F2859)
O2a2b (P164)
O2a2b1 (M134)
O2a2b1a (F450/M1667)
O2a2b1a1 (M117/Page23)
O2a2b1a1a (M133)
O2a2b1a1a1 (F438)
O2a2b1a1a1a (Y17728)
O2a2b1a1a1a1 (F155)
O2a2b1a1a1a1a (F813/M6539)
O2a2b1a1a1a1a1 (Y20928)
O2a2b1a1a1a2 (F1754)
O2a2b1a1a1a2a (F2137)
O2a2b1a1a1a2a1 (F1442)
O2a2b1a1a1a2a1a (F1123)
O2a2b1a1a1a2a1a1 (F1369)
O2a2b1a1a1a2a2 (A16636)
O2a2b1a1a1a3 (Z25907)
O2a2b1a1a2 (FGC23469/Z25852)
O2a2b1a1a2a (F310)
O2a2b1a1a2a1 (F402)
O2a2b1a1a2a1a (F1531)
O2a2b1a1a3 (CTS7634)
O2a2b1a1a3a (F317)
O2a2b1a1a3a1 (F3039)
O2a2b1a1a3a2 (Y29861)
O2a2b1a1a3b (CTS5488)
O2a2b1a1a4 (Z25853)
O2a2b1a1a4a (CTS5492)
O2a2b1a1a4a1 (CTS6987)
O2a2b1a1a4a1a (Z42620)
O2a2b1a1a4a2 ( F20963)
O2a2b1a1a5 (CTS10738/M1707)
O2a2b1a1a5a (CTS9678)
O2a2b1a1a5a1 (Z39663)
O2a2b1a1a5a2 (M1513)
O2a2b1a1a5b (A9457)
O2a2b1a1a5b1 (F17158)
O2a2b1a1a6 (CTS4658)
O2a2b1a1a6a (CTS5308)
O2a2b1a1a6b (Z25928)
O2a2b1a1a6b1 (SK1730/Z25982)
O2a2b1a1a6b1a (Z26030)
O2a2b1a1a6b1b (Z26010)
O2a2b1a1a6b2 (A9462)
O2a2b1a1a6b3 (B456)
O2a2b1a1a7 (YP4864)
O2a2b1a1a7a (Z44068)
O2a2b1a1a7a1 (F5525/SK1748)
O2a2b1a1a7b (Z44071)
O2a2b1a1a8 (Z44091)
O2a2b1a1a8a (Z44092)
O2a2b1a1b (CTS4960)
O2a2b1a2 (F114)
O2a2b1a2a (F79)
O2a2b1a2a1 (F46/Y15)
O2a2b1a2a1a (FGC16847/Z26091)
O2a2b1a2a1a1 (F48)
O2a2b1a2a1a1a (F152)
O2a2b1a2a1a1a1 (F2505)
O2a2b1a2a1a1b (CTS3149)
O2a2b1a2a1a2 (F242)
O2a2b1a2a1a2a (CTS4266)
O2a2b1a2a1a2a1 (Z26108)
O2a2b1a2a1a2a1a (F2173)
O2a2b1a2a1a3 (F2887)
O2a2b1a2a1a3a (F3607)
O2a2b1a2a1a3a1 (F3525)
O2a2b1a2a1a3b (CTS3763)
O2a2b1a2a1a3b1 (A9472)
O2a2b1a2a1a3b2 (FGC16863/Y7110)
O2a2b1a2a1a3b2a (L1360)
O2a2b1a2a1a3b2a1 (FGC16889)
O2a2b1a2a1a3b2b (SK1768/Y7112/Z26257)
O2a2b1a2a1a3b2b1 (F4249)
O2a2b1a2a1a3b2b1a (FGC23868)
O2a2b1a2a1a3b2b2 (CTS335)
O2a2b1a2a1b (CTS53)
O2a2b1a2a1b1 (CTS6373)
O2a2b1a2a1b1a (A9473)
O2a2b1a2a1c (F3386)
O2a2b1a2a1d (Y29828)
O2a2b1a2a1d1 (F735)
O2a2b1a2a1d1a (FGC34973)
O2a2b1a2a1d1b (F1739)
O2a2b1a2b (F743)
O2a2b1a2b1 (CTS8481)
O2a2b1a2b1a (CTS4325)
O2a2b1a2b1a1 (A16629)
O2a2b1a2b1a2 (CTS682)
O2a2b1a2b2 (F748)
O2a2b1a2b2a (F728)
O2a2b1a2c (Page101)
O2a2b2 (AM01822/F3223)
O2a2b2a (AM01856/F871)
O2a2b2a1 (N7)
O2a2b2a1a (F4110)
O2a2b2a1a1 (F4068)
O2a2b2a1a2 (SK1780)
O2a2b2a1b (F4124)
O2a2b2a1b1 (IMS-JST008425p6)
O2a2b2a1b2 (BY15188)
O2a2b2a1b2a (F16411)
O2a2b2a2 (AM01845/F706)
O2a2b2a2a (F717)
O2a2b2a2a1 (F3612)
O2a2b2a2a2 (SK1783)
O2a2b2a2b (AM01847/B451)
O2a2b2a2b1 (A17418)
O2a2b2a2b2 (AM01756)
O2a2b2a2b2a (B450)
O2a2b2a2b2b (AM00472/B452)
O2a2b2a2b2b1 (F18942)
O2a2b2a2b2c (A16427)
O2a2b2b (A16433)
O2a2b2b1 (A16438)
O2a2b2b1a (SK1775)
O2a2b2b1a1 (SK1774)
O2a2b2b1b (A16440)
O2a3 (M300)
O2a4 (M333)
O2b (F742)
O2b1 (F1150)
O2b1a (F837)
O2b1a1 (F1025)
O2b2 (F1055)
O2b2a (F3021)

 See also 
Genetics

Y-DNA O subclades

Y-DNA backbone tree

 Notes 

 References 

Sources for conversion tables

 
 

 
 
 
 
 

 Further reading 

 
 
 
 
 
 
 

 
 
 
 
 
 
 

 External links 

 
 
 
Spread of Haplogroup O, from The Genographic Project, National Geographic''
Y-DNA Phylogenetic Tree of Haplogroup O (DNAHaplogroups.org)
Migration patterns of early Humans and the full size map
China DNA at Family Tree DNA

O-M175